Family over Everything is a compilation album by American record label Only the Family and its leader, American rapper Lil Durk. It was released on by the label alongside Alamo Records and Interscope Records on December 11, 2019. The album features guest appearances from Jusblow600, King Von, NLE Choppa, Polo G, Booka600, C3, G Herbo, Lil Tjay, MK, OTF Ikey, Doodie Lo, and Memo600. It peaked at number 93 on the Billboard 200 in the United States.

Track listing

Charts

References 

Lil Durk albums
2019 mixtape albums